Kressa may refer to:

Kressa (Caria), a town of ancient Caria, now in Asian Turkey
Kressa (Paphlagonia), a town of ancient Paphlagonia, now in Asian Turkey
Kressa (Phocis), a town of ancient Phocis, Greece
Kressa (Thrace), a town of ancient Thrace, now in European Turkey